Antonio Bartolomeo Bruni (28 January 1757 – 6 August 1821) was an Italian violinist, composer and conductor. Bruni was born and died in Cuneo, Italy. During most of his life he resided, played and composed in Paris.

At the height of the French 'terror', c.1791, Bruni authored Un Inventaire sous la terreur which lists musical instruments recovered from noble households. This inventory was published by J. Gallay, editor (Paris: Georges Chamerot, 1890). In the scholarly work The Hurdy-Gurdy in Eighteenth-Century France by Robert E. Green (Indiana University Press, 1995), where the Bruni text is footnoted, Green says of Bruni's inventory "from 111 noble households (it) lists six which possessed vielles (hurdy-gurdies)." p. 17. In the fictional novel The Piano Tuner by Daniel Mason where this affair is again referred to thus: "A Temporary Commission of Arts was set up and ... Bruni ... was named Director of the Inventory. In all, over three hundred were gathered, and each carries its own tragic tale." Mason  goes on to say that 64 were pianofortes.

Works
 Metodo per viola seguito da 25 studi
 Claudine, ou Le Petit Commissionnaire (1794)
 La rencontre en voyage (Comédie en un acte) (1798)
 L'auteur dans son ménage (Opéra-comique en un acte) (1799)
 6 Concertant Trios for 2 Violins and Viola or Cello, Op.1
 6 String Trios, Op.2
 6 Duets for Violin and Viola Op.4
 6 String Trios, Book 4 (Op.4)
 6 Duets for Violin and Viola, Op.25
 6 Duettini, Op.34
 6 String Trios, Op.34
 6 Trios for 2 Violins and Viola, Op.36 (La petite conversation)(6th Book of Trios)
 6 duos concertants pour 2 altos,
 6 Quatuors pour 2 Violons, Alto et Basse
 6 String Quartets

External links 

1757 births
1821 deaths
Italian classical violinists
Male classical violinists
Italian composers
Italian male composers
Italian conductors (music)
Italian male conductors (music)
Italian expatriates in France
People from Cuneo
People of the French Revolution